Rio das Ostras is a municipality located in the Brazilian state of Rio de Janeiro. Its population is 155,193 (2020) and its area is 228 km².

The municipality has been suffering from environmental impacts due to the pollution of beaches, rivers and lagoons due to lack of basic sanitation and environmental degradation due to illegal occupations in areas of environmental protection (APAs) for the protection and conservation of biotic attributes (fauna and flora). The inland discharge of clandestine sewage from homes and businesses has been causing eutrophication in the ecosystem in an aggressive way.

The systemic corruption of the municipality began from its political-administrative emancipation on April 10, 1992, and destroyed much of Rio das Ostras that to date there is no type of basic sanitation. The lack of potable water, sewage, public road paving, and public transportation are old and systemic problems for a municipality that received trillions in oil royalties.

Nowadays, much of the coastline of Rio das Ostras suffers from the advance of the sea, erosions, and uneven irregular constructions. In the urban area there is a significant increase in slums, violence, unemployment and social inequality. The lack of basic sanitation affects every municipality.

Even though Rio das Ostras is struggling in different instances, the city holds various public and private schools for primary and secondary education. Also, it is home for different higher education Universities, such as Universidade Federal Fluminense (UFF), Universidade Unigranrio, and Universidade Estácio de Sá.

References

Populated coastal places in Rio de Janeiro (state)
Municipalities in Rio de Janeiro (state)